Louis Cyr is a 2013 Canadian drama film. A biopic directed by Daniel Roby, the film stars Antoine Bertrand as Canadian strongman Louis Cyr. The film is based on a novel by Paul Ohl.

Its cast also includes Gilbert Sicotte, Rose-Maïté Erkoreka, Guillaume Cyr, Gil Bellows, Eliane Gagnon, Normand Carrière, Amélie Grenier, Cliff Saunders and Marilyn Castonguay. The film was nominated for four Canadian Screen Awards, winning two.

Cast
 Antoine Bertrand - Louis Cyr
 Gilbert Sicotte - Gustave Lambert
 Guillaume Cyr - Horace Barré
 Rose-Maïté Erkoreka - Mélina Cyr
 Gil Bellows - Richard Fox
 Cliff Saunders - Mac Sohmer
 Amélie Grenier - Philomène Cyr

Reception
The film was the top-grossing film of the year in Quebec.

Accolades

References

External links
 
 

2013 films
2013 biographical drama films
Canadian biographical drama films
Films directed by Daniel Roby
Films based on Canadian novels
2013 drama films
Best Film Prix Iris winners
French-language Canadian films
2010s English-language films
2010s Canadian films